Auboué is a commune in the Meurthe-et-Moselle department in northeastern France.

Early years

An 1832 plan of the village of Auboué shows 50–60 houses, sheds, barns and stables on each side of the Orne river.
The church of Coinville had been built, but the church of Auboué had not yet been built, although the location had been set aside and is marked on the plan.
At the end of the 19th century there were 100 voters, but ten families of farmers and craftsmen ran the village, sitting in the 10-person municipal council.
Often a son or son-in-law succeeded his father or father-in-law.

Industrialization

Xavier Rogé of the Société de Pont-à-Mousson began to investigate land around Auboué, and on 1 December 1882 found the upper layers of the iron oxide formation of the Briey Basin.
The survey then stopped, since the company undertaking it declared that the iron oxide formation had been completely crossed.
Rogé's assistant Camille Cavallier thought there could be lower layers, and obtained permission to continue the survey.

The technicians said that it would be very difficult to pass through the overburden above the Auboué ore deposit due to the amount of water it contained.
The gamble succeeded.
In 1892–93, due to excavation of the first mine, the population started to rise, reaching 662 in 1901.
In 1903 Cavallier installed blast furnaces at Auboué.
In 1905 he purchased the Moineville concession, which was later merged with the Auboué concession.
When the foundry was put into service the population rose to 2,100 in 1906 and 4,388 in 1911.

During World War I (1914–18) Auboué was occupied by the Germans.
The blast furnaces were destroyed, and the mine was put out of operation.
The population dropped during the war, then slowly started to recover, reaching a maximum of 5,271 in 1931.
After the economic recession of 1968–70, the town lost industry and commerce and reverted to becoming a small dormitory community.

Population changes

See also
Communes of the Meurthe-et-Moselle department

References

Sources

Communes of Meurthe-et-Moselle